The men's singles table tennis event at the 2011 Pan American Games was held from October 18–20 at the CODE Dome in Guadalajara, Mexico.

Medals

Round robin
The round robin was used as a qualification round. The forty participants were split into groups of four. The top two players from each group advanced to the first round of playoffs. Groups were announced at the technical meeting the day before the competition began.

Group A

Group B

Group C

Group D

Group E

Group F

Group G

Group H

Group I

Group J

Playoffs

Finals

Top half

Bottom half

References

Table tennis at the 2011 Pan American Games